William Young (born 14 December 1970) is a former English cricketer. Young was a left-handed batsman who bowled left-arm medium-fast.  He was born at Peterborough, Cambridgeshire.

Young made his List A debut for Huntingdonshire in the 2000 NatWest Trophy against the Hampshire Cricket Board at Grasmere Road, Cove, where he took his 3 List-A wickets, including the wicket of future South African captain Graeme Smith. For his performance in the match he was named man of the match.  His second and final List-A match come in the same competition against a Yorkshire Cricket Board side.

References

External links
Billy Young at Cricinfo
Billy Young at CricketArchive

1970 births
Sportspeople from Peterborough
English cricketers
Huntingdonshire cricketers
Living people